Macquarie, until 1910 The Macquarie, an electoral district of the Legislative Assembly in the Australian state of New South Wales, was created in 1894, re-created in 1904, retaining nothing but the name, then abolished in 1920.


Election results

Elections in the 1910s

1917 by-election

1917

1913

1910

Elections in the 1900s

1907

1904

1901

Elections in the 1890s

1898

1895

1894

Notes

References

New South Wales state electoral results by district